José  Bartolome Fernández Jr. (22 September 1923 – 19 June 1994) was the sixth Governor of Central Bank of the Philippines. Under his term, he served two Philippine presidents and was the governor under one turbulent event, the People Power Revolution of 1986.

References

Governors of the Bangko Sentral ng Pilipinas
1923 births
1994 deaths
Filipino bankers
Corazon Aquino administration personnel
Ferdinand Marcos administration personnel